Yeghtsahogh or Sarybaba is a village that is, de facto, in the Shushi Province of the breakaway Republic of Artsakh; de jure, it is in the Shusha District of Azerbaijan, in the disputed region of Nagorno-Karabakh. The village has an ethnic Armenian-majority population, and also had an Armenian majority in 1989.

History 
During the Soviet period, the village was part of the Shusha District of the Nagorno-Karabakh Autonomous Oblast of Azerbaijan Soviet Socialist Republic.

Historical heritage sites 
Historical heritage sites in and around the village include a cemetery from between the 17th and 19th centuries, an 18th-century spring monument, the 18th/19th-century church of Surb Astvatsatsin, an 18th/19th-century shrine, and the church of Surb Sargis built in 2003.

Economy and culture 
The population is mainly engaged in agriculture and animal husbandry. As of 2015, the village has a municipal building, a house of culture, a secondary school, and a medical centre. The Yeghtsahogh branch of the Shushi Children's Music School is also located in the village. The Yeghtsahogh community includes the villages of Kanach Tala and Tasy Verst.

Demographics 
The village had 132 inhabitants in 2005, and 118 inhabitants in 2015.

References

External links 

 
 

Populated places in Shushi Province
Populated places in Shusha District